Taeryong River is a river of North Korea. The river is a tributary of the Ch'ongch'on River.

See also
Rivers of Korea

Rivers of North Korea
North Pyongan